120 Squadron may refer to:
 120 Squadron (Israel), a unit of the Israeli Air Force
 120 Squadron, Republic of Singapore Air Force
 120 Squadron Royal Netherlands Air Force
 120 Squadron SAAF, a unit of the South African Air Force
 120th Fighter Squadron, a unit of the Colorado Air National Guard
 No. 120 (Netherlands East Indies) Squadron RAAF, a join Dutch and Australian unit 
 No. 120 Squadron RAF, a unit of the United Kingdom Royal Air Force